Lemera is a locality in the northwest of Uvira in the South Kivu province, in the Democratic Republic of Congo. It is located 60 kilometers north of Bukavu, 90 kilometers southwest of the Rwandan and Burundian border. Lemera is situated nearby to the villages of Kasheke, Nyambasha, Luzira, Lukayo, Kajuju, Lushasha and Ihusi.

History 
Lemera was the capital of Bafuliiru chiefdom, a Bantu-speaking people who migrated to Uvira from the 17th century onwards. Lemera owes its name to Mulemera, father of Kahamba, and founder of the Bufuliiru dynasty in Lemera. The capital was large and powerful, with a population comparable to that of Ghent at the time — approximately 20,000 during its heyday. At the beginning, Bafuliiru chiefdom was very sparsely populated and any newcomer individual or group could settle there provided they recognized the authority of the mwami of the Bahamba clan. The latter's power was more symbolic than real. Moreover, it was felt only in localities close to the Court. The distant groupement leaders pledged allegiance to him, but did not feel so controlled by him.

On October 6, 1996, in Zaire, during the First Congo War, supported by Rwanda, the Banyamulenge rebels attacked the town causing several dozen victims. 37 people were killed in a hospital, including two members of the medical staff. The armed elements also ransacked the Lemera hospital, which is about 85 kilometers north of Uvira and is the largest hospital in South-Kivu.

In May 2021, the Twigwaneho (a Banyamulenge rebel group) and their allies led by an army deserter Colonel Michel Rukunda alias Makanika attacked the camp of Mai-Mai Biloze Bishambuke fighters in Masango, in the Bijombo groupement, chiefdom of Bavira. Meanwhile, northeast of Lemera, clashes between Ngumino militiamen and the Mayi-Mayi coalition and Burundian FNL left seven people dead. These fights took place in the village Kifuni, northeast of the capital of the chiefdom of Bafuliiru.  

In early 2022, the re-emergence of the March 23 Movement, which occupies several localities in the east of the country, created tensions in Lemera. Defeated in 2013, the March 23 Movement, whose fighters had taken refuge in Uganda and Rwanda, resumed military activities in 2022, causing several Congolese to flee to Lemera from other regions. According to the coordinator of ACMEJ/Katogota, Eric Muvomo, nearly one hundred new cases of displaced children have been received by another NGO “Espace d'amis d'enfance” (EAE) in Kidote, in the middle plateaux of Lemera.

Economy 
Agriculture and animal husbandry are the two main activities of Lemera. The agriculture sector is an important component of the regional economy. The main food crops grown include cassava (nearly 25% of national production), yams, maize, groundnuts, oil palm, okra (dongo -dongo), zucchini, eggplant, pepper, tomato, cucumber, roselle (Guinea sorrel) and soybeans whose introduction is quite recent.

See also 

 Mulenge
 Luvungi
 Kalehe
 Baraka

References 

Populated places in South Kivu